Carolina Birkner (born 25 April 1971) is an Argentine alpine skier. She competed in four events at the 1988 Winter Olympics.

She is the sister of Ignacio Birkner, Magdalena Birkner, and Jorge Birkner.

References

1971 births
Living people
Argentine female alpine skiers
Olympic alpine skiers of Argentina
Alpine skiers at the 1988 Winter Olympics
Sportspeople from Bariloche